Roy Tang Yun-kwong is a Hong Kong government official. He joined the administrative service in 1987. He served as the twelfth Commissioner of Customs and Excise of Hong Kong. He is the current Permanent Secretary for Constitutional and Mainland Affairs.

Career

1987: Civil service in Administrative Service 
In 1987, Tang joined the Administrative Service for the Government of Hong Kong.

2010: Deputy Secretary for Labour and Welfare 
In 2010, Tang was appointed Deputy Secretary for Labour and Welfare.

2011-2015: Director of Broadcasting, RTHK 
On September 9, 2011, Tang was appointed by the Hong Kong government as the Director of Broadcasting, the head of Radio Television Hong Kong (RTHK). Tang's appointment took effect on September 15, 2011. However, Tang, who was previously an administrative officer, did not have experience in the field of broadcasting at the time he was appointed. Therefore, many people, especially RTHK staff members, called into question Tang’s suitability for the role and saw Tang as the embodiment of government intervention into freedom of the press, fearing he would interfere with their editorial independence.

After Tang took up his broadcasting post, he was criticized for politically interfering with the affairs of the RTHK. Criticisms of Tang have continued from his initial appointment up to the present. A survey conducted by the Democratic Party in 2013 revealed that over 40% of respondents wished for Tang to step down from his position.

Besides his inexperience in broadcasting before his appointment, Tang was accused of having a dual role as he was both the chief editor of broadcasting at RTHK and an administrative officer in the government. This led to criticisms that Tang may have a pro-government stance while performing his job in RTHK.

2012: Legco Review 
In 2012 Tang suggested terminating the 26-year-old programme Legco Review in an internal meeting. This led to criticisms that Tang was attempting to eliminate RTHK's ability to criticize controversial world issues. Some parties believe that RTHK's programmes were mostly used to mock the government officials and government policies in a one-sided manner. They think that Tang, as a government official, could balance the internal views in RTHK towards the government. Thus, they staged a rally  and started campaigns to support Tang. Some parties were dissatisfied with Tang's actions, which they viewed as political interference. They aired their grievances through the mass media, creating groups and pages on social media like Facebook to draw attention to the issue.  Some even made fun of Tang by nicknaming him "the last samurai of RTHK" or spoofing his photos.

2013: Headliner 
In 2013 Tang criticized the idea of using Adolf Hitler and the Nazis as characters in the programme Headliner. In the end, the producers scrapped the idea and used characters from the story Journey to the West instead. This led to criticism that Tang was interfering with RTHK's editorial independence by using his authority.

In 2013 Tang did not approve the promotion of Sze Wing-yuen, RTHK's assistant director of TV and corporate business. Some claimed that it was because Sze had defied Tang's orders, hindering Tang's completion of his "political mission".

2015: Commissioner of Customs and Excise 
In 2015, Tang was appointed Commissioner of Customs and Excise.

2017: Permanent Secretary for Constitutional and Mainland Affairs 
In 2017, Tang was appointed Permanent Secretary for Constitutional and Mainland Affairs.

References 

Living people
Government officials of Hong Kong
Hong Kong civil servants
1963 births